Eulimacrostoma fuscus is a species of sea snail, a marine gastropod mollusk in the family Eulimidae. The species was previously one of a number within the genus Eulima.

Distribution

This species occurs in the following locations:
 Caribbean Sea
 Cuba
 Gulf of Mexico
 Mexico

Description 
The maximum recorded shell length is 13.3 mm.

Habitat 
Minimum recorded depth is 110 m. Maximum recorded depth is 1170 m.

References

External links

Eulimacrostoma
Gastropods described in 1889